The Absalom Scales House is a historic house in Eagleville, Tennessee, U.S..

History
The house was built circa 1790 for Absalom Scales, a settler from North Carolina, and his wife Nancy Dalton, whose paternal grandfather, Samuel Dalton Sr., was a British immigrant and personal friend of U.S. President James Madison. In 1835, it was inherited by their son Noah, who lived here with his wife, Mary Batie Sayers, and their four children.

During the American Civil War of 1861–1865, Noah's daughter Mary stayed in the house with her husband, John Knox Womack, who was a Free Will Baptist preacher whose uncle was Confederate General A. P. Hill. At the same time, Womack joined the Confederate States Army and served under General Nathan Bedford Forrest. After the war, Womack resumed his ministry. After his wife died, he married her sister Charlotte, with whom he had six children. The house was later inherited by his daughter Nancy and her husband, Joseph A. Johnston.

Architectural significance
The house was designed in the Classical Revival architectural style, and it was later remodelled in the Greek Revival style. It has been listed on the National Register of Historic Places since October 30, 1973.

References

Houses on the National Register of Historic Places in Tennessee
Greek Revival architecture in Tennessee
Neoclassical architecture in Tennessee
Houses completed in 1790
Buildings and structures in Rutherford County, Tennessee